In mathematics, Moore space may refer to:

 Moore space (algebraic topology)
 Moore space (topology), a regular, developable topological space.